Samuel Prideaux Robards (born December 16, 1961) is an American actor. The son of actors Jason Robards and Lauren Bacall, he is best known for his role as Henry Swinton in the film A.I. Artificial Intelligence, based on the science fiction short story "Supertoys Last All Summer Long" by English writer Brian Aldiss.

Early life and education
Robards was born in New York City, the son of actor Jason Robards, Jr. (1922–2000) and actress Lauren Bacall (1924–2014). He is the only child from their marriage, though he has seven half-siblings; five through his father (three elder, two younger), and through his mother's marriage to Humphrey Bogart, half-siblings Stephen Humphrey and Leslie Bogart. Robards was seven when his parents divorced, which Bacall later blamed on the elder Robards' alcoholism. Robards recalled he was devastated by the divorce, and said he was raised "basically alone." Afterwards, he resided with his mother in New York. Several years after the divorce, Sam moved to Europe with his mother and for a time lived in London, where he attended the American School in London, later returning to New York City where he attended Collegiate School.

Robards attended Sarah Lawrence College, but was expelled after his freshman year due to poor grades and bad behavior. In the fall of 1980, he attended the National Theater Institute at the Eugene O'Neill Theater Center in Waterford, Connecticut.

Career
Robards began his acting career in 1980 in an off-Broadway production of Album, and made his feature-film debut in director Paul Mazursky's 1982 film Tempest. In 1985, Robards starred alongside Kevin Costner and future wife Suzy Amis in Fandango. Robards acted opposite his father in the 1988 film Bright Lights, Big City, which was their only collaboration before his death in 2000. Also in 1988, he was cast in the lead role of Kevin Keegan in the CBS drama TV 101 which was scheduled opposite Top 10 shows Roseanne and Matlock; the series was cancelled amidst a controversial abortion story line.

In 1990, he played the role of Chris Elliott's friend, Larry, on the Fox sitcom Get a Life, but left after the first season. In 1994, Robards starred in two films: Robert Altman's film Prêt-à-Porter, where he was a part of an ensemble that included his mother; and Alan Rudolph's biographical film of Dorothy Parker, Mrs. Parker and the Vicious Circle, where he portrayed the first editor of The New Yorker, Harold Ross.

His film résumé also includes Casualties of War, Beautiful Girls, American Beauty, A.I. Artificial Intelligence, Life as a House, The Other Side of the Tracks, and The Art of Getting By.

Robards's television credits include a recurring role on and appearances on Spin City, The West Wing, Law & Order, Law & Order: Criminal Intent, Sex and the City, The Outer Limits, and Body of Proof. He had recurring roles on the series Gossip Girl (ended in 2012) and Treme (ended in 2013), and a regular role on Twisted (cancelled in 2014).

In the theatre, Robards was nominated for Broadway's 2002 Tony Award as Best Actor (Featured Role – Play) for Arthur Miller's The Man Who Had All the Luck. In July 2008, Robards took over the role of Richard Hannay in the New York City theatrical run of The 39 Steps.

Personal life
In 1986, he married actress Suzy Amis, his co-star in Fandango. They had a son, Jasper, before their divorce in 1994. In 1997, Robards married Danish model Sidsel Jensen. They have two sons, Calvin and Sebastian.

Filmography

Film

Television

References

External links

1961 births
Male actors from New York City
American male film actors
American male stage actors
American people of English descent
American people of German descent
American people of Irish descent
American people of Romanian-Jewish descent
American people of Russian-Jewish descent
American people of Swedish descent
American people of Welsh descent
Collegiate School (New York) alumni
Sarah Lawrence College alumni
Living people